Hilterman is a surname. Notable people with the surname include:

Jeredy Hilterman (born 1998), Dutch footballer
Jordy Hilterman (born 1996), Dutch footballer

See also
Hiltermann